The white-throated woodcreeper (Xiphocolaptes albicollis) is a species of bird in the Dendrocolaptinae subfamily. It is found in Argentina, Brazil, and Paraguay.

Its natural habitats are subtropical or tropical moist lowland forests and subtropical or tropical moist montane forests.

References

External links

white-throated woodcreeper
Birds of Brazil
white-throated woodcreeper
Taxa named by Louis Jean Pierre Vieillot
Taxonomy articles created by Polbot